Lakshmikantam or Laxmikantam is an Indian given name:

 Balijepalli Lakshmikantam, actor, poet, screenwriter, dramatist
 Pingali Lakshmikantam, an Indian poet and writer.

Indian given names